Louis Earl Goodman (January 2, 1892 – September 15, 1961) was a United States district judge of the United States District Court for the Northern District of California.

Education and career

Born in Lemoore, California, Goodman received a Bachelor of Arts degree from the University of California, Berkeley in 1913 and a Bachelor of Laws from the University of California, Hastings College of the Law in 1915. He was in private practice in San Francisco, California from 1915 to 1942, and was a member of a Selective Service Local Board from 1940 to 1942.

Federal judicial service

On November 9, 1942, Goodman was nominated by President Franklin D. Roosevelt to a seat on the United States District Court for the Northern District of California vacated by Judge Harold Louderback. Goodman was confirmed by the United States Senate on December 15, 1942, and received his commission on December 24, 1942. He served as Chief Judge from 1958 until his death on September 15, 1961 in Palo Alto, California.

See also
 List of Jewish American jurists

References

Sources
 

1892 births
1961 deaths
Judges of the United States District Court for the Northern District of California
United States district court judges appointed by Franklin D. Roosevelt
20th-century American judges
University of California, Berkeley alumni
University of California, Hastings College of the Law alumni